WCGW is a Christian radio station licensed to Nicholasville, Kentucky serving all of Central Kentucky.

It broadcasts Southern gospel and country gospel music on the frequency of 770 kHz.

WCGW leaves the air from sunset to sunrise to protect the nighttime skywave signal of WABC in New York City.  WABC is a Class A station and it's 770 AM is a United States clear-channel frequency.

Translators

External links
Official site

CGW
Southern Gospel radio stations in the United States
CGW
Nicholasville, Kentucky